Wendy Lynn Wiebe (born 6 June 1965) is a Canadian rower. She competed in the women's lightweight double sculls event at the 1996 Summer Olympics.

References

External links
 

1965 births
Living people
Canadian female rowers
Olympic rowers of Canada
Rowers at the 1996 Summer Olympics
Rowers from St. Catharines
Commonwealth Games medallists in rowing
Commonwealth Games bronze medallists for Canada
Rowers at the 1986 Commonwealth Games
Pan American Games medalists in rowing
Pan American Games silver medalists for Canada
Pan American Games gold medalists for Canada
Rowers at the 1995 Pan American Games
Medalists at the 1995 Pan American Games
20th-century Canadian women
Medallists at the 1986 Commonwealth Games